Gerald Arthur Paulson (July 21, 1935 – March 6, 1986) was an American professional basketball player. Paulson was selected in the 1957 NBA draft (third round, 17th pick overall) by the Cincinnati Royals after a collegiate career at Manhattan College. He appeared in six NBA games in his career and averaged 3.3 points, 1.7 rebounds and 0.7 assists per game.

References

1935 births
1986 deaths
American men's basketball players
Basketball players from New York City
Cincinnati Royals draft picks
Cincinnati Royals players
Guards (basketball)
Manhattan Jaspers basketball players
Sportspeople from the Bronx